Antonio "Tony" Veloso Cuenco (March 26, 1936 – June 27, 2020) was a Filipino politician who served as a council member for the 2nd District of the Cebu City Council. He also served as the Secretary-General of the ASEAN Inter-Parliamentary Assembly (AIPA) from 2010 to 2013 and as representative of the 2nd District of Cebu City in the House of Representatives.

Personal life
Born on March 26, 1936, to a well-known family in Cebu, the Cuenco family, "Tony" was the son of former Gov. Manuel Cuenco and Milagros Veloso-Cuenco, the grandnephew of former Rep. Miguel Cuenco (5th district), and the grandson of the former Senate President, Mariano Jesús Cuenco.  He was married to former congresswoman (2nd district), Nancy Roa-Cuenco with four children; Cebu City Councilor James Anthony Cuenco, Cebu City Councilor Ronald Cuenco, Antonio Cuenco, Jr., and Cynthia Cuenco-Dizon.

He spent his secondary education (high school) in Ateneo de Cagayan, and received his Bachelor of Arts and Bachelor of Law degrees from Ateneo de Manila University.

Political career
At 29, he was one of the youngest Congressmen elected during the 6th Congress (1965–1969 in Cebu City 5th District). He had also been a member of the 8th, 9th and 10th Congresses (1987–1998) and the Batasang Pambansa (1984–1986).

After his wife's term (1998–2001), he ran for Cebu City 2nd District's Congressional seat.  Since then, he led that area through the 12th and 13th congress.

On May 18, 2007, he was elected to a third term as Congressman of the 2nd District of Cebu City in the House of Representatives. His term ended on June 30, 2010, when Tomas Osmeña took his oath as his successor.

Cuenco ran for, and won a seat in the Cebu City Council during the 2019 elections placing 4th with 140,139 votes.

Death 
On June 27, 2020, Cuenco died due to the effects of COVID-19 during the COVID-19 pandemic in the Philippines as confirmed by his son, former Cebu City Councilor James Anthony Cuenco. The younger Cuenco said that his father experienced "mild fever and incessant coughing" on June 18 which prompted them to conduct a swab test and later showed on June 20 that the elder Cuenco was positive from the said virus.

References

 Office of the House Member. "Member Information."  Congress of the Philippines; House of Representatives.  https://web.archive.org/web/20051201115836/http://www.congress.gov.ph/members/about.php?id=cuenco (4 May 2007).
 "Legislative Performance." I-Site Database.  http://www.i-site.ph/Databases/Congress/13thHouse/personal/cuenco-personal.html (5 May 2007)

External links
 Official Information (Office of the House Member Database)
 Personal Information
 Curriculum Vitae
 Makati Business Club Congress Watch

|-

1936 births
2020 deaths
Members of the House of Representatives of the Philippines from Cebu City
Members of the House of Representatives of the Philippines from Cebu
People from Cebu City
Antonio
Lakas–CMD politicians
Probinsya Muna Development Initiative politicians
Deputy Speakers of the House of Representatives of the Philippines
Ateneo de Manila University alumni
Members of the Batasang Pambansa
Cebu City Council members
Recipients of the Presidential Medal of Merit (Philippines)
Deaths from the COVID-19 pandemic in the Philippines